Mölndalsfallen or Mölndals fall (Mölndals waterfall) has been a big part of the Mölndal industries, the industries got their power from the fall to make cotton, paper and oil.

References

Industry in Sweden